Type 85 may refer to:
 Type 85 AFV, a Chinese APC
 Type 85 Susang, a North Korean ATGM tank destroyer
 Type 85 submachine gun
 Type 85/YW 306, 23 mm cannon
 Type 85, a Chinese tank
 W85 Heavy Machine Gun
 AMES Type 85, RAF radar system
 Linesman/Mediator radar systems
 A Chinese produced variant of the SVD (rifle)
 Type-085 nuclear aircraft carrier, for the Future Chinese aircraft carrier